Denise Gaule (born 1991) is a camogie player and student. The winner of the Young Player of the Year award of 2009, she played in the 2009 All Ireland camogie final. She came to public attention during the 2009 All-Ireland semi-final against Galway when she scored three fine points, just one week after helping Kilkenny to yet another All-Ireland Minor title, and her second in the grade. She also holds two All-Ireland Senior colleges medals and won an All-Ireland Intermediate crown of 2008 when she was declared player of the match in the final.

References

External links 
 Official Camogie Website
 Kilkenny Camogie Website
 Review of 2009 championship in On The Ball Official Camogie Magazine
 https://web.archive.org/web/20091228032101/http://www.rte.ie/sport/gaa/championship/gaa_fixtures_camogie_oduffycup.html Fixtures and results] for the 2009 O'Duffy Cup
 All-Ireland Senior Camogie Championship: Roll of Honour
 Video highlights of 2009 championship Part One and part two
 Video Highlights of 2009 All Ireland Senior Final
 Report of All Ireland final in Irish Times Independent and Examiner

1991 births
Living people
Kilkenny camogie players
Waterford IT camogie players